Crazy Frog Racer 2 (known as Crazy Frog: Arcade Racer in North America)  is a 2006 racing game developed by Neko Entertainment and the sequel to the 2005 racing game Crazy Frog Racer. It was published by Valcon Games in the United States and Turtle Games in the United Kingdom.

This game includes traditional race mode (locations ranging from the snow to the city), a pinball style game and a jukebox to watch videos like Crazy Frog's Popcorn and the original songs.

Reception 
Metacritic, a review aggregator, rated the PlayStation 2 version 29/100 based on five reviews. Sam Bishop of IGN rated it 2.5/10 and wrote, "Despite not looking like the ocular abortion that one would expect, I still wouldn't even wish it upon my worst enemy."

References 

2006 video games
Internet memes
Neko Entertainment games
PlayStation 2 games
Racing video games
Video games about amphibians
Video games developed in France
Video game memes
Windows games
Multiplayer and single-player video games
Valcon Games games